Józefa Chromik (born 10 June 1946) is a Polish cross-country skier. She competed in three events at the 1972 Winter Olympics.

Cross-country skiing results

Olympic Games

References

External links
 

1946 births
Living people
Polish female cross-country skiers
Olympic cross-country skiers of Poland
Cross-country skiers at the 1972 Winter Olympics
People from Tatra County